Březovice is a municipality and village in Mladá Boleslav District in the Central Bohemian Region of the Czech Republic. It has about 300 inhabitants. The village of Víska with valuable examples of folk architecture is protected as a village monument reservation.

Administrative parts
The village of Víska is an administrative part of Lobodice.

References

Villages in Mladá Boleslav District